"My Savior" is a Christian rock song sung by Krystal Meyers, composed by her and Ian Eskelin. It appears on her self-titled debut album and was included in a 2006 expansion pack for the Dance Praise video game.

References

2005 singles
Krystal Meyers songs
Songs written by Krystal Meyers
Songs written by Ian Eskelin
2005 songs
Essential Records (Christian) singles
Song recordings produced by Ian Eskelin